Chalcides pentadactylus, or five-fingered skink, is a species of skink found in the Western Ghats of India. Females of other species of the genus are viviparous, meaning that they give birth to live young. Almost nothing is known of C. pentadactylus. It is only known from the holotype which is lost [ fide Smith 1935]. Due to the loss of the only known specimen the true identity and origin of this skink, and its correct generic assignment, must await the examination of fresh material (Srinivasulu & Srinivasulu 2013).

Type locality: "Kuddle Poondy, a tidal river near Beypore" (= Kadal Undi, Beypur, 11° 11' N; 75° 49' E, in Kerala State, south-western India), Malabar district.

References

 Beddome, R.H. 1870 Descriptions of some new lizards from the Madras Presidency. Madras Monthly J. Med. Sci. 1: 30–35. Original description of Sphenocephalus pentadactylus.
 Smith, M.A. 1935. The Fauna of British India, including Ceylon and Burma. Taylor and Francis, London.
 Srinivasulu, C. & Srinivasulu, B. 2013. Chalcides pentadactylus. The IUCN Red List of Threatened Species 2013: e.T172689A1367498. 

Chalcides
Reptiles described in 1870
Taxa named by Richard Henry Beddome